Local-access television may refer to:

Public, educational, and government access, cable television narrowcasting and specialty channels
 Public-access television, narrowcast, non-commercial mass media where the general public can create content
 Educational television, the use of television programs in the field of distance education
 Government-access television, specialty television channel created by government entities
 Leased access, FCC-mandated airtime for use by independent cable programmers

See also
 List of public-access TV stations in the United States

American public access television
Television terminology